Founded in 2002, U.S. Gas & Electric, Inc., its subsidiaries and family of companies ("USG&E") is a provider of energy supply to commercial and residential customers. Recognized by Inc. magazine as one of the Fastest-Growing Private Companies in America within the energy industry, USG&E services customers in Connecticut, District of Columbia, Illinois, Indiana, Kentucky, Maryland, Massachusetts, Michigan, New Jersey, New York, Ohio and Pennsylvania with plans for further expansion.

Founded in 2002  by Douglas Marcille and associates, and establishing CEO Don E. Secunda, Esq., the company is based in White Plains, New York, with its principal offices in Miramar, Florida.  In 2013, Doug Marcille was named as the Florida State Business Ambassador by Florida Governor Rick Scott

References

Energy companies established in 2002
Electric power companies of the United States
Companies based in Florida